Bhada Kalan is a small hamlet in Siwan Block in Siwan District of Bihar state, India. As of 1981, the village had an area of 144.47 hectares and a population of 1,157.

Languages 
Bhojpuri is the local language spoken in this area

References

Villages in Siwan district